Cyril James Brownlie (6 August 1895 – 7 May 1954) was a New Zealand rugby union player. He was educated at Sacred Heart College, Auckland,  unlike his brothers, Maurice and Laurie, who attended St Patrick's College, Wellington.

The brothers represented the country during the 1920s. Cyril Brownlie played 31 matches for the All Blacks, scoring 11 tries. These matches included three tests during The Invincibles tour of 1924–25. During the England-New Zealand test in 1924, Cyril was sent off by the referee Albert Freethy, the first player to be sent off in an international between two International Rugby Board countries.
Brownlie represented Hawkes Bay at a provincial level, playing as a loose forward.

References

External links

1895 births
1954 deaths
New Zealand international rugby union players
New Zealand rugby union players
Hawke's Bay rugby union players
Rugby union players from Whanganui